The North East Australian Football League (NEAFL) was an Australian rules football league in New South Wales, Queensland, the Australian Capital Territory and the Northern Territory. The league was formed in November 2010, and its inaugural competition was in 2011. It was a second division league, sitting below the national Australian Football League (AFL) and featured the reserves teams of the region's four AFL clubs playing alongside six non-AFL affiliated NEAFL senior teams. Nine NEAFL seasons were contested between 2011 and 2019, before the 2020 season was cancelled due to the COVID-19 pandemic, and the league was amalgamated into the Victorian Football League from 2021.

History
The NEAFL was formed at the end of 2010 primarily as an amalgamation of the two major football leagues in Australia's north-east - the Queensland Australian Football League, based in South-East Queensland and including one team from the Northern Territory, and AFL Canberra, based around ACT, and including one team from Sydney (the reserves team of the AFL's Sydney Swans). The two leagues were converted to NEAFL conferences: the Northern Conference, serving Queensland and the Northern Territory, and the Eastern Conference, serving New South Wales and the ACT. Teams from the two conferences played matches against each other throughout the home-and-away season, before each conference staged a separate finals competition to determine both a northern premier and an eastern premier. The two premiers then played each other in the NEAFL Grand Final.

Two new teams also joined the competition for its inaugural season in 2011: the reserves team of Gold Coast Football Club (whose senior team joined the AFL in the same season); and the senior team of the Greater Western Sydney Giants, which was preparing to join the AFL in 2012. These two clubs would have joined the QAFL and AFL Canberra respectively, had the NEAFL not been formed.

In 2012, two more clubs joined the Eastern Conference from the AFL Sydney competition: Sydney Hills and Sydney University. With 's senior team joining the AFL, its NEAFL side became a reserves team in partnership with, and under the name of the University of Western Sydney.

On 11 May 2013, the NEAFL Northern Conference played an interstate game against South Australia who represent the South Australian National Football League (SANFL). The game, played at the City Mazda Stadium in Adelaide resulted in a 21.14 (140) to 9.4 (58) win over the NEAFL North, with SA's higher fitness level the main difference between the two sides.

On 8 June 2013, the NEAFL Eastern Conference played an interstate game against Tasmania who represent the TSL (Tasmanian State League). Tasmania won 15.11 (101) - 8.13 (61).

A major restructure of the league was announced for the 2014 season. Five clubs left the competition and the conference system was abolished. Broadbeach, Labrador, Morningside and Mt. Gravatt joined a re-constructed Queensland Australian Football League, while Tuggeranong went back to the AFL Canberra Division One competition. The possibility of a North Queensland side entering the competition for 2014 was considered but ruled out.

Due to the financial challenges of participating in the competition and a proposal from the AFL for the existing Canberra clubs to contribute to a single Canberra team, Belconnen, Queanbeyan and the Sydney Hills Eagles chose to leave the NEAFL at the end of the 2014 season. The ongoing desire by the AFL for a single Canberra team led Ainslie to withdraw at the end of the 2015 season. Both Canberra clubs - Ainslie and Eastlake - had a NEAFL licence until the end of 2016, but Ainslie withdrew from the competition after the AFL rejected their proposal to be Canberra's sole team from 2017. The AFL wanted Canberra's team to be either a combined Ainslie-Eastlake side or a representative team funded largely by all the local clubs in the Canberra area.

Two teams changed their names prior to the 2016 season. Eastlake's NEAFL side started to play as the Canberra Demons in an attempt to be seen as Canberra's representative team in the NEAFL competition. The club wishes to provide a clear AFL pathway for local talent and to get rid of the baggage between other clubs in the ACT. As part of this decision the team also adopted a blue and gold guernsey for home games, reflecting the territory's traditional colours. The team still wears Eastlake's red and black colours in away matches. The Greater Western Sydney reserves team became known as the Western Sydney University Giants to reflect the re-branding of the University of Western Sydney.

At the end of the 2019 season, AFL Northern Territory announced the disbanding of the NT Thunder, citing financial and logistical difficulties. The competition scope therefore decreased to capture Queensland, New South Wales and the Australian Capital Territory. The 2020 season was then cancelled altogether, owing to the infeasibility of interstate travel during the COVID-19 pandemic.

In August 2020, the AFL announced that the NEAFL would be amalgamated into the Victorian Football League in 2021, bringing an end to the competition's nine-season history. The NEAFL's clubs will all have the opportunity to join the Victorian Football League, though given the finances associated with travel the independent non-AFL clubs are considered unlikely to join the league.

Clubs

Final Clubs

Notes

Former clubs

League awards
Current league awards have been instituted since 2014.

Premiers

NEAFL MVP award

NEAFL Rising Star

NEAFL leading goal kicker

NEAFL coach of the year

Former league awards

Grogan Medal (2011–2013)

Awarded to the best and fairest players in the Northern Conference.

Mulrooney Medal (2011–2013)

For the best and fairest players in the Eastern Conference.

NEAFL (Northern) Rising Star award (2011–2013)
Awarded to an outstanding young player in the Northern Conference.

NEAFL (Eastern) Rising Star award (2011–2013)
Awarded to an outstanding young player in the Eastern Conference

Ray Hughson Medal (2011–2013)
Highest goalkicker award for player in Northern Conference

Most successful clubs

See also
 List of Australian rules football leagues in Australia
 AFL Canberra
 Queensland Australian Football League
 Sydney AFL

References

External links
 Official website (archived)
 AFL description of league
 AFL announces new north-eastern comp

Australian rules football in Australia
Defunct Australian rules football competitions in the Australian Capital Territory
Defunct Australian rules football competitions in Queensland
Defunct Australian rules football competitions in New South Wales
Defunct Australian rules football competitions in the Northern Territory
Defunct professional sports leagues in Australia
Sports leagues established in 2011